The 1972 Toronto Argonauts finished in fourth place in the Eastern Conference with a 3–11 record and failed to make the playoffs.

Offseason

Regular season

Standings

Schedule

Awards and honors
Jim Stillwagon, Defensive Tackle, CFL All-Star

References

Toronto Argonauts seasons
1972 Canadian Football League season by team